Sharad Kumar (born 1 March 1992) is an Indian para high jumper and a former world no. 1. Born in Muzaffarpur, he made his International debut at the 2010 Asian Para Games. At the 2014 Asian Para Games, he won the gold medal in the high jump (T42), breaking a 12-year Asian Games record, and reclaimed the world no. 1 position. Kumar participated in the 2016 Summer Paralympics finishing sixth. He won Silver in 2017 World ParaAthletics Championships. He is supported by GoSports Foundation through the Para Champions Programme.

Early life
Sharad Kumar was born on 1 March 1992 in Muzaffarpur, Bihar. At the age of two, he suffered paralysis of his left leg after taking spurious polio medicine at a local eradication drive. Sharad studied at St. Paul's School (Darjeeling) where he started high jump in Class 7. He broke school and district records competing against able-bodied athletes. For further studies, he moved to Delhi, where he studied his Plus Two at Modern School and graduated in Political Science from Kirori Mal College. Post Graduation  in Politics with Specialization in International relations from Jawaharlal Nehru University.

Career

Sharad made his international debut in 2010 at the Asian Para Games in Guangzhou. In January 2012, he jumped 1.64m, thus qualifying for the 2012 Paralympics. In April 2012, with a jump of 1.75m at the Malaysian Open Para athletics championship, he became world no. 1 at the age of 19. However he missed the London Paralympics after testing positive for a banned drug. He made his comeback in the 2014 Para Asian Games, where he won gold by clearing 1.80m, breaking a 12-year Asian Games record and also regaining the world no. 1 spot. He participated in the Rio Paralympics 2016, finishing at sixth position with a best of 1.77m. He started training under Mr. Satyanarayana, National Para Athletics Coach since March 2015. He won Silver in 2017 World ParaAthletics Championships with a jump of 1.84m.
He won Gold Medal in 2018 Para Asían Games Jakarta setting a new Game Record and Continental Record by jumping 1.90m.

Training in Ukraine since 2017, under TOPS (target Olympic podium scheme, government of India )

See also
Kriti Raj Singh

References

Indian male high jumpers
1992 births
Living people
Paralympic athletes of India
Athletes (track and field) at the 2016 Summer Paralympics
Sportspeople from Patna
People from Bihar
Athletes from Bihar
St. Paul's School, Darjeeling alumni
Athletes (track and field) at the 2020 Summer Paralympics
Paralympic bronze medalists for India
Medalists at the 2020 Summer Paralympics
Paralympic medalists in athletics (track and field)
Recipients of the Arjuna Award